The UEFA European Under-18 Championship 1982 Final Tournament was held in Finland. It also served as the European qualification for the 1983 FIFA World Youth Championship. The competition was won by Scotland, their first tournament win at any international level.

Qualification

Group 8

Other groups

|}

Teams
The following teams qualified for the tournament:

 
 
 
 
 
  (host)

Squads

Group stage

Group A

Group B

Group C

Group D

Semifinals

Third place match

Final

Qualification to World Youth Championship
The six best performing teams qualified for the 1983 FIFA World Youth Championship: four semifinalists and the best group runners-up (based on points, goal difference and scored goals).

References

External links
Results by RSSSF

UEFA European Under-19 Championship
1982
Under-18
May 1982 sports events in Europe
1982 in Finnish football
1982 in youth association football